The plus–minus sign, is a mathematical symbol with multiple meanings:
In mathematics, it generally indicates a choice of exactly two possible values, one of which is obtained through addition and the other through subtraction.
In experimental sciences, the sign commonly indicates the confidence interval or uncertainty bounding a range of possible errors in a measurement, often the standard deviation or standard error. The sign may also represent an inclusive range of values that a reading might have.
In medicine, it means "with or without".
In engineering, the sign indicates the tolerance, which is the range of values that are considered to be acceptable, safe, or which comply with some standard or with a contract.
In botany, it is used in morphological descriptions to notate "more or less".
In chemistry, the sign is used to indicate a racemic mixture.
In chess, the sign indicates a clear advantage for the white player; the complementary minus-or-plus sign, indicates the same advantage for the black player.
In electronics, this sign may indicate a dual voltage power supply, such as ±5 volts means +5 volts and -5 volts, when used with audio circuits and operational amplifiers.
In linguistics, it may indicate a distinctive feature, such as [±voiced].

History
A version of the sign, including also the French word ou ("or"), was used in its mathematical meaning by Albert Girard in 1626, and the sign in its modern form was used as early as 1631, in William Oughtred's Clavis Mathematicae.

Usage

In mathematics

Only one of these two replaced equations is true for any valid solution. A common use of this notation is found in the quadratic formula

which describes the two solutions to the quadratic equation ax2 + bx + c = 0.

Similarly, the trigonometric identity

In contrast to the quadratic formula example, both of the equations described by this identity are simultaneously valid.

However, the  sign is generally preferred over the  sign, so if both of them appear in an equation, it is safe to assume that they are linked.

which represents the two equations:

Another example where the minus–plus sign appears is

A third related usage is found in this presentation of the formula for the Taylor series of the sine function:

Here, the plus-or-minus sign indicates that the term may be added or subtracted, in this case depending on whether  is odd or even, the rule can be deduced from the first few terms. A more rigorous presentation of the same formula would multiply each term by a factor of (−1), which gives +1 when  is even, and −1 when  is odd. In older texts one occasionally finds (−), which means the same.

When the standard presumption that the plus-or-minus signs all take on the same value of +1 or all −1  is not true, then the line of text that immediately follows the equation must contain a brief description of the actual connection, if any, most often of the form “where the ‘±’ signs are independent” or similar.

In statistics
For example,  may be anywhere in the range from 5.5 to 5.9 inclusive. In scientific usage, it sometimes refers to a probability of being within the stated interval, usually corresponding to either 1 or 2 standard deviations (a probability of 68.3% or 95.4% in a normal distribution).

Operations involving uncertain values should always try to preserve the uncertainty—in order to avoid propagation of error.

A percentage may also be used to indicate the error margin. For example,  refers to a voltage within 10% of either side of 230 V (from 207 V to 253 V inclusive). Separate values for the upper and lower bounds may also be used. For example, to indicate that a value is most likely 5.7, but may be as high as 5.9 or as low as 5.6, one may write .

In chess

Encodings
In Unicode: 
In ISO 8859-1, -7, -8, -9, -13, -15, and -16, the plus–minus symbol is code 0xB1hex. This location was copied to Unicode.
The symbol also has a HTML entity representations of &pm;, &plusmn;, and &#177;.
The rarer minus–plus sign is not generally found in legacy encodings, but is available in Unicode as  so can be used in HTML using &#x2213; or &#8723;.
In TeX 'plus-or-minus' and 'minus-or-plus' symbols are denoted \pm and \mp, respectively.
Although these characters may also be produced using underlining or overlining + symbol ( +  or  ), this is deprecated because the formatting may be stripped at a later date, changing the meaning. It also makes the meaning less accessible to blind users with screen readers.

Typing
Macintosh:  (equal sign on the non-numeric keypad).
 AutoCAD shortcut string:

Similar characters

See also
≈ (approximately equal to)
Engineering tolerance
Plus and minus signs
Sign (mathematics)
Table of mathematical symbols

References

Elementary arithmetic
Mathematical symbols
Addition
Subtraction